Diwan Singh Kalepani (1894–1944) was a Punjabi poet. He participated in the Indian freedom movement and the Non-cooperation movement in the 1920s. He wrote poetry in free verse and composed two volumes of poetry: Vagde Pani (‘Running Waters’) in 1938, and Antim Lehran (‘Winding Waves’) which was published posthumously in 1962. His poetry often revolved around criticism of the British Raj and of organized religion.

Diwan Singh Kalepani passed his Matriculation in 1916 and in 1921 he got the diploma in Medical Service from Agra and joined the Medical Corps of the Indian Army. The most important period of life began when he was transferred to Rangoon in British Burma, from where he was transferred to the Andaman Islands in 1927 to a school where students were taught Tamil, Telugu and Punjabi. In the Gurudwara, Diwan Singh used to recite his poems and discuss with Indian people the problems of slavery and freedom.

During the Second World War when Japan occupied the Andamans in 1942, Diwan Singh could not get reconciled to it. The Japanese officers ordered him to make a speech against the Britishers on the Penang Radio, but Diwan Singh declined. He was arrested in 1943 by the Japanese. The remaining 65 members of Punjabi Sabha were also put behind the bars. After about six months of torture, he was butchered along with other members of the Punjabi Sabha. Diwan Singh's collection of poems Vagade pani (Flowing water) was published in 1938 and his second collection Antim Lehran (Last tides) was published posthumously. Diwan Singh was not interested in conventional poetry and wrote in romantic-satirical free-verses on which Puran Singh's influence can also be seen. His scientific outlook made his poetry deep and intellectual. He believed in the direct poetry, very much like Puran Singh, and thus, strengthened the trend for succeeding generation of poets.

References

Punjabi-language poets
1894 births
1944 deaths
British Indian Army soldiers
20th-century Indian poets
Indian torture victims
Executed Indian people
People executed by Japanese occupation forces
20th-century executions by Japan
Indian male poets
People from Agra
Poets from Uttar Pradesh
20th-century Indian male writers